Night Queen (Gecenin Kraliçesi) is a Turkish TV show released on Star TV in 2016. The leading roles in this series are played by Meryem Uzerli, Ugur Polat and Murat Yıldırım.

Plot summary

Kartal's father was murdered by two of his best friends, Aziz and Osman when he was 6 to 7 years old. Osman fled after the murder, fearful that Aziz would kill him next. Meanwhile, Kartal was raised by Aziz alongside his two children, Esra and Mert. When Esra was five years old, their mother died while giving birth to Mert. As he grew older, Kartal was arranged to marry Esra and came to be in charge of Aziz's business. It was through this position that he was able to travel to France accompanied by his brother, Emre. While in France, Kartal met a girl named Selin, who turned out to be Osman's daughter. Despite Kartal's marriage to Esra, Kartal and Selin fell in love.

When Kartal returned to Turkey and requested a divorce from Esra, she attempted to murder him and take her own life. In addition, Aziz threatened to kill Selin for he wanted to break up her and Kartal. To prevent any misfortune, Kartal broke Selin's heart by telling her that he didn't love her and that he was already married to someone else. Selin returned to Turkey four years later with her three-year-old son, who was fathered by Kartal. In Turkey, Selin met Aziz, and they married after he fell in love with her. Selin had traveled to Turkey to bring vengeance to the man who had attempted to murder her father. When she discovered that her father was involved in the scam, she got him arrested and sentenced to prison. However, when Aziz's family discovered that he was a killer, they all turned against him, leading to him committing suicide. Despite repeated murder attempts, Esra reconciled with Selin a month later. Mert apologized to Kartal for presuming he was only looking for a way to take their money. Kartal and Esra divorced, and Esra went to a mental institution for treatment, allowing Kartal to marry Selin.

References 

Turkish television series
2016 Turkish television series debuts
Turkish drama television series
Television series produced in Istanbul
Television shows set in Istanbul
Television series set in the 2010s